Young European Federalists (JEF) is a political youth organisation. Active in most European countries, it seeks to promote European integration through the strengthening and democratisation of the European Union (EU). JEF has close ties to the European Movement and the Union of European Federalists and is a full member of the European Youth Forum (YFJ).

Former activists of JEF can join the alumni association, Friends of JEF.

History
First founded in the late 1940s, the now existing European level structure of the JEF was founded in the 1970s.

It was around the 1950s that the first groups of young federalists appeared as a youth section of the Union of European Federalists. The Young European Federalists organized themselves into JEF sections, establishing a new European structure with a European office in Paris in 1949. Despite the split within the federalist movement in the 1950s, the various JEF groups carried on with their work on local, regional and national levels even if there was no more any international JEF organization.

In 1967, young people held mock negotiations in Brussels to work out a treaty of accession for the UK to the Community. In March 1969 they organized a demonstration on the spectators benches of the European Parliament, demanding its direct elections by universal suffrage. In many European countries protest demonstrations were organized against the dictatorship in Greece. These activities helped the first groups of young federalists to set up very close collaboration and to tighten their links again. This collaboration took concrete form in the creation of JEF's liaison office in 1970. It was there that the international association took the name of ‘Young European Federalists' and the founding Congress was held in Luxembourg on 25 and 26 March 1972.

Even though JEF was still interested in the European Community, new topics became increasingly important for JEF in the 70's: direct election of the European Parliament, east–west reunification and enlargement, disarmament, women, the environment and international development issues. In 1985, when Jacques Delors became President of the European Commission and launched the idea of the Single Market, institutional questions became important in the discussion in JEF since it seemed that a real European Democracy can be established in a short time and JEF said of itself: Young Europeans, simply a generation ahead, which is still the JEF motto nowadays. In the 90s three basic developments influenced the work and the discussions of JEF: 
 the return of nationalist wars in Europe;
 the crisis of legitimacy of the European integration process, highlighted by the Danish referendum in 1992, the lost Norwegian referendum in 1994 and the negative attitude of a majority of EU citizens towards the Euro;
 the open questions on the enlargement of the European Union.
Since the 2000s, JEF Europe has worked a lot on institutional issues calling for a European federal constitution and a more democratic Europe. Another major area of interest for JEF is the defense of human rights and the respect of the state of law especially with a yearly Belarus action since 2006.

Goals
According to its statutes, JEF is a non-partisan and non-denominational European NGO. It advocates for a united Europe with a federal structure. At the centre of JEF's political program is the demand for a federal constitution for Europe, whose core element is a two-chamber Parliament (consisting of a directly elected chamber and a chamber of states). Hereby, JEF insists on the subsidiarity principle as a form of decentralized distribution of powers. Another key element is the demand for a unified foreign and security policy of the European Union. JEF is committed to comprehensive reform of the EU towards more democracy, participation, transparency, efficiency and sustainability. In addition to the policy objectives, the organisation tries in particular to promote European awareness among young people and encourage civic activism.

Activities
JEF spreads its ideas by the following means:
Campaigns to lobby over a longer period of time for a specific federalist cause.
Street actions mobilising the entire network to raise awareness of burning European issues among the general public. (Most notably the annual Free Belarus street action, taking place in numerous cities Europe- and worldwide since 2006) 
International events such as seminars and trainings on a wide range of topics in different EU and non-EU countries.
A multilingual, interactive webzine thenewfederalist where youth can voice their opinion in articles on current European affairs.
Projects that implement a specific goal and for which specific funding was received.
Press releases for the advocacy of JEF's objectives towards both public and private organisations.
Consequently, the organisation encourages debate on European affairs and EU policies while fostering youth mobility and exchanges throughout the continent, thus seeking to involve European Citizens, in particular young people, from all across the continent in the process of European integration.

Organisation
JEF has about 15,000 members in 31 widely autonomous national sections, which are coordinated by a European umbrella organisation, JEF Europe.

JEF Europe

JEF Europe is an International association without lucrative purpose (IVZW/AISBL) under Belgian law. The European Secretariat is based in Brussels.

The European Congress
The highest decision-making body of JEF is the European Congress, which meets every two years in a different city. The delegates are elected by the members of national sections or their representatives in proportion to the number of members of each section.

The Congress elects the President and two Vice Presidents, a Treasurer, 4 members of the executive board as well as 16 directly elected members of the Federal Committee.

1972 Luxembourg City (founding) (Luxembourg)
1974 Luxembourg City
1975 Innsbruck (Austria)
1977 Berlin (Germany)
1979 Sundvollen (Norway)
1981 Milan (Italy)
1983 The Hague (Netherlands)
1985 Berlin
1987 Canterbury (United Kingdom)
1989 Opheylissem (Belgium)
1991 Hurdalsjøen (Norway)
1992 Vejle (extraordinary) (Denmark)
1993 Munich (Germany)
1995 Milan (Italy)
1997 Bruges (Belgium)
1999 Marly-le-Roi (France)
2001 Vienna (Austria)
2003 Stockholm (Sweden)
2005 Strasbourg (France)
2007 Copenhagen (Denmark)
2009 Firenze (Italy)
2011 Helsinki (Finland)
2013 Paris (France)
2015 Zurich (Switzerland)
2017 Valletta (Malta)
2019 Paris (France)
2021 Liège (Belgium)

The Federal Committee
The Federal Committee (FC) meets twice a year and is composed by the President, the two Vice Presidents, the four executive board members and 16 members directly elected by the Congress, and a number of national representatives corresponding appointed by each of the national member sections. The Secretary General participates in the meeting without a voting right.

The Federal Committee is chaired by a presidium of three members and adopts the political and strategical guidelines and oversees the activity of the executive board.

The Executive Board
The executive board (EB) is chaired by the President and includes the two Vice Presidents, the Secretary General, the Treasurer, and  four board members. It is responsible for the implementation of the external and internal policy resolutions adopted by the Congress and the Federal Committee and the management of the organisation.

It meets at least four times every year.

Presidents 
 
 Since 2021: Antonio Argenziano
2019-2021: Leonie Martin
2015-2019: Christopher Glück
2011-2015: Pauline Gessant
2009-2011: Philippe Adriaenssens
2007-2009: Samuele Pii
2005-2007: Jan Seifert
2003-2005: Jon Worth
2001-2003: Alison Weston
1999-2001: Paolo Vacca
1997-1999: Philip Savelkoul
1995-1997: Ugo Ferruta
1993-1995: Tor Eigil Hodne
1991-1993: Stephen Woodard
1989-1991: Giannis Papageorgiou
1987-1989: Lars Erik Nordgaard
1985-1987: Manfred Auster
1983-1985: Franco Spoltore
1981-1983: David Grace
1979-1981: Richard Corbett
1977-1978: Jean Jacques Anglade
1976-1977: Flor van de Velde
1974-1976: Julian Priestley
1972-1974: Peter Osten

Secretary Generals 

Since 2022 Judit Lantai
2018-2022 Milosh Ristovski
2016-2018: Valentin Dupouey
2014-2016: Ioan Bucuras
2013-2014: Federico Guerrieri
2012: Stefan Manevski
2010-2012: Ruben Loodts
2008-2010: Peter Matjašič
2006-2008: Vassilis Stamogiannis
2004-2006: Joan Marc Simon
2002-2004: Marianne Bonnard
2000-2002: Niki Klesl
1998-2000: Laura Davis
1996-1998: Tobias Flessenkemper
1994-1996: Ingo Linsenmann
1992-1994: Bernd Hüttemann
1992: Soraya Usmani Martinez
1989-1991: Irmeli Karhio
1987-1989: Monica Frassoni
1985-1987 Giannis Papageorgiou
1984-1985: Susana Roson
1982-1984: Tore Nedrebo
1981-1982: Eva Finzi
1980-1981: David Grace 
1977-1980: Jacques Vantomme
1975-1977: Gerda Grootjes

Notable alumni
Several current and former influential members of the European Parliament (MEPs), including Richard Corbett and Jo Leinen (PES), Tom Spencer (Conservative) and Monica Frassoni (Greens), and its former Secretary General Sir Julian Priestley served as JEF officers in their teens and twenties. The former Swedish Prime Minister and Foreign Minister Carl Bildt was a vice president.

See also
European Movement
Union of European Federalists
Federalism
Federalist flag
Centre for Studies on Federalism
Young European Movement UK

References

External links

Young European Federalists
A short history of the Young European Federalists (1997) by Tobias Flessenkemper, The New Federalist 
Friends of JEF alumni network of the Young European Federalists (JEF Europe)
The archives of the 'European Federalists' are deposited at the Historical Archives of the EU in Florence

Eurofederalism
Federalist organizations
International nongovernmental youth organizations
International organisations based in Belgium
International organizations based in Europe